Tianshui Association (pronounced in Japanese "Tensui Kai" and in Chinese "Tianshui Hui") is a mutual assistance association in Japan of the 300 Japanese railway engineers who worked under forced labor for the construction of the Tianshui-Lanzhou Railway, Gansu Province, China.

General
China Railway Corporation in 1950 restarted the construction of the Tianshui-Lanzhou Railway (354 km), now part of Longhai Railway between Lianyungang and Lanzhou, and gathered 300 Japanese former South Manchuria Railway engineers and others with their families in Tianshui, Gansu Province, to work under forced labor for this project. The railway was completed in 1952 and those Japanese workers, who were repatriated to Japan in 1953, formed Tianshui Association, a mutual assistance association.

See also
 Tianshui-Lanzhou Railway
 South Manchuria Railway
 Forced labor

References

Tianshui
Lanzhou
Non-profit organizations based in Japan
Unfree labour